1434 Margot, provisional designation , is a stony Eoan asteroid from the outer regions of the asteroid belt, approximately 29 kilometers in diameter. It was discovered on 19 March 1936, by Soviet astronomer Grigory Neujmin at the Simeiz Observatory on the Crimean peninsula. The asteroid was named after Gertrud Margot Görsdorf, a friend of German astronomer of Wilhelm Gliese.

Orbit and classification 

Margot is a member the Eos family, the largest asteroid family of the outer asteroid belt consisting of nearly 10,000 asteroids. It orbits the Sun at a distance of 2.8–3.2 AU once every 5 years and 3 months (1,916 days). Its orbit has an eccentricity of 0.07 and an inclination of 11° with respect to the ecliptic.

Physical characteristics 

In the Tholen classification, Margot is a common S-type asteroid. Pan-STARRS photometric survey also characterizes it as a stony S-type, while the overall spectral type for Eoan asteroids is that of a K-type.

Rotation period 

In June 1984, a rotational lightcurve of Margot was obtained from photometric observations by American astronomer Richard Binzel . Lightcurve analysis gave a well-defined rotation period of 8.17 hours with a brightness amplitude of 0.52 magnitude, indicative of a somewhat elongated shape.

Diameter and albedo 

According to the surveys carried out by the Infrared Astronomical Satellite IRAS, the Japanese Akari satellite and the NEOWISE mission of NASA's Wide-field Infrared Survey Explorer, Margot measures between 27.178 and 30.84 kilometers in diameter and its surface has an albedo between 0.117 and 0.1353.

The Collaborative Asteroid Lightcurve Link derives an albedo of 0.1106 and a diameter of 29.49 kilometers based on an absolute magnitude of 10.66.

Naming 

This minor planet was named by German astronomer Wilhelm Gliese after Gertrud Margot Zottmann (1915–1990; née Görsdorf), his friend and schoolfellow for several years at Berlin. Gliese, after whom the asteroid  is named, is best known for the Gliese Catalogue of Nearby Stars, which is itself the source of name for many discovered exoplanets. The discovery circumstances and naming were researched by Lutz Schmadel, the author of the Dictionary of Minor Planet Names.

References

External links 
 Asteroid Lightcurve Database (LCDB), query form (info )
 Dictionary of Minor Planet Names, Google books
 Asteroids and comets rotation curves, CdR – Observatoire de Genève, Raoul Behrend
 Discovery Circumstances: Numbered Minor Planets (1)-(5000) – Minor Planet Center
 
 

001434
Discoveries by Grigory Neujmin
Named minor planets
001434
19360319